Leon McQuay III (born November 21, 1994) is a former American football safety. He played college football at USC. He is the grandson of Leon McQuay who was a running back drafted by the New York Giants in 1973.

Professional career
McQuay was drafted by the Kansas City Chiefs in the sixth round, 218th overall, in the 2017 NFL Draft. He was waived on September 2, 2017 and was signed to the Chiefs' practice squad the next day. He was elevated to the active roster on December 11, 2017.

On September 1, 2018, McQuay was waived by the Chiefs and was signed to the practice squad the next day. He was promoted to the active roster on October 13, 2018, but was waived three days later and re-signed back to the practice squad. He signed a reserve/future contract with the Chiefs on January 25, 2019. He was waived on May 7, 2019.

References

External links
 USC Trojans bio
 Kansas City Chiefs bio
 

1994 births
Living people
American football safeties
Kansas City Chiefs players
People from Seffner, Florida
Players of American football from Florida
Sportspeople from Hillsborough County, Florida
USC Trojans football players